The 1958 Challenge Desgrange-Colombo was the eleventh and final edition of the Challenge Desgrange-Colombo. It included eleven races: all the races form the 1957 edition were retained and the Vuelta a España was included for the first time. Fred De Bruyne won the third of his three individual championships while Belgium retained the nations championship. The Challenge Desgrange-Colombo folded after the 1958 season and the Super Prestige Pernod replaced it as the season-long competition for road bicycle racing.

Races

Final standings

Riders

Nations

References

 
Challenge Desgrange-Colombo
Challenge Desgrange-Colombo
1958 in European sport